The Tulsa Golden Hurricane men's soccer team is an intercollegiate varsity sports team of the University of Tulsa. The team is a member of the American Athletic Conference (The American) in the National Collegiate Athletic Association.  In the last two decades, Tulsa has been regularly ranked in the Top 25 NSCAA Collegiate men's soccer poll.

History

The Tulsa men's soccer team started as a varsity sport in 1980.  That year, they finished the season with seven wins, six losses and one tie.  The first win came against John Brown University.
Tulsa's third head coach, Randy Waldrum, led the school to their first NCAA tournament in 1991, and was the coach during Tulsa's record setting consecutive home wins and consecutive home games without a loss streaks, the longest in NCAA history, set during the same stretch of 39 games from 1988 to 1992.

TU has won four conference championships and eight conference tournaments.  The Golden Hurricane has twice reached the elite-eight of the NCAA Men's Soccer Championship, falling to eventual champion Indiana in 2004 and top seeded Akron in 2009. Tulsa has participated in eleven NCAA tournaments during its history (1991, 2003, 2004, 2007, 2008, 2009, 2010, 2012, 2014, 2015, 2016).  The school has produced Soccer's first All-American Frank Velez in 1991.  It has also produced its first team All-American, Ryan Pore, who played for the Portland Timbers, and previously played for Kansas City Wizards of Major League Soccer.  Terry Boss of Seattle Sounders FC and Lawson Vaughn of D.C. United are former Golden Hurricane who played in MLS.  Dominic Cervi played for Celtic F.C. of Glasgow, Scotland, and fellow goalkeeper Tyrel Lacey signed with FC Lyn Oslo of Oslo, Norway. Since 1995, the head coach has been Tom McIntosh, a prominent figure in Tulsa soccer for over 20 years.

Current squad

Colors and badge
The team uses the school colors of Old Gold, Royal Blue, and Crimson .

Stadium
The team plays in the Hurricane Soccer & Track Stadium, site of the 2009 C-USA conference tournament.

Notable players

Ryan Pore, First-Team All-American, finalist for the 2004 Hermann Trophy.  Played for the Portland Timbers, Montreal Impact, and Kansas City Wizards.

Frank Velez, 1991 Second-Team All-American, University of Tulsa Athlete of the Year 1991.  Played for the Dallas Rockets

Head coaches
Listed according to when they became head coach for Tulsa (year in parentheses):

 1970s–1980s: Walter Schnoor (1980), Bruce Palmbaum (1986), Randy Waldrum (1989)
 1990s–2000s: Tom McIntosh (1995)

Achievements
 Missouri Valley Conference Regular Season:
 Winners (1): 1991
 Missouri Valley Conference Tournament:
 Winners (1): 1991
 Conference USA Regular Season:
 Winners (3): 2007, 2008, 2009
 Conference USA Tournament:
 Winners (4): 2007, 2008, 2009, 2012
 American Athletic Conference Regular Season:
 winners (1): 2021
 American Athletic Conference Tournament:
 Winners (4): 2014, 2015, 2016, 2021

Records
 Most Goals in a game: 16 (16–0) vs. Nicholls State University, September 9, 1990
 Most consecutive wins: 12, 1989
 Most home wins: 39, 1988–1992
 Most Goals by a Freshman Frank Velez (17)
 Most Career Goals Frank Velez (62)
 Most Career Points Frank Velez (136)

See also
 University of Tulsa
 Tulsa Golden Hurricane
 College soccer
 SMU–Tulsa men's soccer rivalry

References

External links
 

 
Soccer clubs in Oklahoma
1980 establishments in Oklahoma